The Consolidated P-30 (PB-2) was a 1930s United States two-seat fighter aircraft. An attack version called the A-11 was also built, along with two Y1P-25 prototypes and YP-27, Y1P-28, and XP-33 proposals. The P-30 is significant for being the first fighter in United States Army Air Corps service to have retractable landing gear, an enclosed and heated cockpit for the pilot, and an exhaust-driven turbo-supercharger for altitude operation.

Design and development
In 1931, the Detroit Aircraft Corporation, parent company of the Lockheed Aircraft Company built a two-seat single-engined fighter aircraft based on the Lockheed Altair high-speed transport as a private venture. The prototype, the Detroit-Lockheed XP-900, flew in September 1931 and was purchased by the United States Army Air Corps as the Lockheed YP-24. Its performance was impressive, being faster than any fighter then in service with the Air Corps, and an order for five Y1P-24 fighters and four Y1A-9 attack aircraft was placed for the new aircraft, despite the loss of the prototype on 19 October 1931. The Detroit Aircraft Corporation went into bankruptcy eight days later, however, leading to the cancellation of the contract.
  
When the Detroit Aircraft Corporation failed, the chief designer of the YP-24, Robert J. Woods was hired by Consolidated Aircraft. Woods continued to develop the YP-24, the design becoming the Consolidated Model 25, with all-metal wings replacing the wooden wings of the YP-24 and a larger tail. The Army Air Corps ordered two prototypes as the Y1P-25 in March 1932, to be powered by a Curtiss V-1570-27, fitted with a turbo-supercharger on the port side of the forward fuselage. The order for the second prototype was quickly changed to a Y1A-11 attack aircraft, omitting the supercharger.

First to fly was the Y1P-25, which was delivered to the Air Corps on 9 December 1932.

The Y1A-11, armed with four forward-firing machine guns instead of the two of the Y1P-25 and racks for 400 lb (182 kg) of bombs was delivered to Wright Field on 5 January 1933. On 20 January 1933 the Y1A-11 disintegrated in midair, killing pilot Lt. Irvin A. Woodring. Despite the loss of both prototypes in a week, on 1 March 1933, the Air Corps placed an order for four P-30 fighters and four A-11 attack aircraft. These production variants differed from the prototypes in having stronger fuselages, simplified undercarriages and more powerful engines.

Operational history
The first P-30 was delivered in January 1934. Testing showed that the gunner's cockpit was uncomfortable and cold at the high altitudes where the P-30 was intended to fight, while the rearward facing gunners were liable to black out when the aircraft was maneuvered. Despite these concerns, on 6 December 1934, the U.S. Air Corps placed an order for a further 50 P-30As, with more powerful V-1570-61 engines driving a three-bladed variable-pitch propeller and with oxygen supplies for the crew.

Three of the four P-30s were delivered to the 94th Pursuit Squadron at Selfridge Field in 1934. The first P-30A, by this time redesignated PB-2A (Pursuit, Biplace), made its maiden flight on 17 December 1935, with deliveries to service units starting on 28 April 1936. The last of the 50 PB-2As were completed by August that year.

While intended as a high altitude fighter, the PB-2 flew relatively few high altitude flights, partly because of the discomfort for the crew. One exception took place in March 1937, when a PB-2A was flown to  before being forced to return to lower altitudes when the aircraft's controls froze. Since the PB-2A was one of the few aircraft at the time to have retractable landing gear, they were frequently damaged in "wheels-up" landings when the pilots forgot to extend the landing gear.

One PB-2A was modified to a single-seat configuration as the PB-2A Special, to compete in a 1936 Air Corps competition for a new fighter to replace the Boeing P-26 Peashooter. It was larger and heavier than the other competitors and was much more expensive. It crashed during testing, with the Seversky P-35 being ordered into production. One A-11 was converted to the XA-11A testbed with the new 1,000 hp (746 kW) Allison XV-1710-7 engine.

While the PB-2 was sturdy, the two-seat fighter concept was obsolete by the time the aircraft entered service, and by 1939, all had been replaced in front-line service by Seversky P-35 and Curtiss P-36 Hawk aircraft. The survivors remained in use as training aircraft until after the start of World War II, with the last being withdrawn from use on 2 June 1942.

Variants
Y1P-25
Further development of Lockheed YP-24 with all-metal wing,  Curtiss V-1570-27 Conqueror turbo-supercharged engine. Two fixed forward firing .30 in machine guns and one flexibly mounted gun in rear cockpit. One built. 
Y1A-11
Ground-attack version of Y1P-25. Powered by unsupercharged engine and armament of 4x forward firing .30 in guns in nose, one in rear cockpit and up to 400 lb (182 kg) of bombs. One built.
YP-27
Proposed variant of Y1P-25 with  Pratt & Whitney R-1340-21G Wasp radial engine. Unbuilt.
Y1P-28
Proposed variant of Y1P-25 with 600 hp R-1340-19 Wasp; unbuilt. 
P-30
Initial production batch for Army Air Corps.  Curtiss V-1570-57 turbo-supercharged engine. Four built, later redesignated PB-2.

A-11
Initial production ground-attack aircraft, with unsupercharged V-1570-59 engine. Four built.
P-30A
Main production fighter powered by  turbo-supercharged Curtiss V-1570-61 engine; 50 built, redesignated PB-2A.

PB-2A Special
Seventh PB-2A modified to single-seat configuration. Crashed during flight testing.
XP-33
 Proposed version with  Pratt & Whitney R-1830-1 Twin Wasp engine; unbuilt.  
XA-11A
Conversion of A-11 as testbed for  Allison XV-1710-7. One converted.

Specifications (PB-2A)

See also

References
Notes

Bibliography

 Angelucci, Enzo. and Peter M. Bowers. The American Fighter. New York: Orion Books, 1987. .
 Dorr, Robert F. and David Donald. Fighters of the United States Air Force. London: Temple Press/Aerospace, 1990. 
 Francillon, René J. Lockheed Aircraft since 1913. London: Putnam, 1982. .
 Green, William and Gordon Swanborough. "The end of the beginning ... The Seversky P-35". Air Enthusiast Ten, July–September 1979, pp. 8–21.
 Pelletier, Alain J. "Singular Two-Seater: Consolidated's PB-2A – The USAAC's Only Two-Seat Fighter". Air Enthusiast No. 85,  January/February 2000, pp. 2–11. ISSN 0143-5450.
 Swanborough, Gordon and Peter M. Bowers. United States Military Aircraft Since 1909. Washington, D.C.: Smithsonian, 1989. .
 Wegg, John. General Dynamics Aircraft and their Predecessors. London: Putnam, 1990. .

External links

 Consolidated P-30/PB-2A
 National Museum of the USAF fact sheet: Consolidated P-30

Consolidated P-30
P-30
Single-engined tractor aircraft
Low-wing aircraft
Aircraft first flown in 1934